Mike MacDonald is an American basketball coach, currently serving as the head men's basketball coach at Daemen College. He previously served as head basketball coach at Canisius College from 1997 to 2006, and at Medaille College from 2006 to 2014. MacDonald has an all-time career record of 386–277. MacDonald was named head men's basketball coach at Daemen College on September 16, 2014.

Head coaching record

References

External links
 Daemen profile
 Medaille profile
 Canisius profile

Living people
Canisius Golden Griffins men's basketball coaches
Year of birth uncertain
Year of birth missing (living people)